The 2018–19 Serie A (women) is the 52nd season of the women's football top level league in Italy. Juventus is the defending champions. The season is scheduled to run from 15 September 2018 to 20 April 2019.

Teams
Two teams finished at the bottom of the league and were relegated at the end of the 2017-18 season: Empoli and San Zaccaria. 

Brescia, who finished second in Serie A last season, AGSM Verona who finished seventh and Res Roma who finished eighth, sold their licenses respectively to Milan, Hellas Verona and Roma.

Stadiums and locations

Personnel and kits

League table

Results

Season statistics

Top goalscorers

Last updated: 20 April 2019

Number of teams by region

References

External links

 Official website

2018-19
2018–19 domestic women's association football leagues
Women